Oxysterol-binding protein-related protein 1 is a protein that in humans is encoded by the OSBPL1A gene.

This gene encodes a member of the oxysterol-binding protein (OSBP) family, a group of intracellular lipid receptors. Most members contain an N-terminal pleckstrin homology domain and a highly conserved C-terminal OSBP-like sterol-binding domain, although some members contain only the sterol-binding domain. Transcript variants derived from alternative promoter usage and/or alternative splicing exist; they encode different isoforms.

References

Further reading